Devon Edward Sawa (born September 7, 1978) is a Canadian actor. Sawa began acting when he was a teenager and appeared in several films in the 1990s including Little Giants, Casper, Now and Then, Wild America, Idle Hands, and Final Destination. He also played the title character of the Eminem music video "Stan" and starred as Owen Elliot in The CW action spy drama series Nikita.

Early life
Sawa was born on September 7, 1978, in Vancouver, the son of Joyce and Edward Sawa, a mechanic. He has two older siblings. His father is Polish, and his mother is "a little bit of everything".

Career
Sawa began his career in 1992 as a children's action toy spokesman. He made his film debut in Little Giants in 1994 and received wide recognition for playing the title role as a human boy in Casper the following year. In Now and Then, Sawa played the town bully, Scott Wormer. Sawa also appeared in the films Wild America, Idle Hands, and Final Destination. In 2000, Sawa played the title character of the Eminem music video "Stan". Sawa later did voice acting, voicing Flash Thompson in Spider-Man: The New Animated Series. Sawa continued to work steadily in the 2000s and appeared in several independent films, including Extreme Dating, Shooting Gallery, Devil's Den, Creature Of Darkness, Endure, 388 Arletta Avenue, The Philly Kid, and A Resurrection.

In 2010, Sawa portrayed the role of Owen Elliott on The CW action drama series Nikita. In July 2012, he was promoted to series regular in the third season of Nikita; the show ended after four seasons in 2013. In 2017, Sawa portrayed the role of Nico Jackson in Somewhere Between; the show ended after one season. Sawa appeared as Lester Clark Jr. in Escape Plan: The Extractors. In 2019, he starred in the thriller The Fanatic, where he played Hunter Dunbar, an actor who is stalked by a character named Moose. The movie was directed by Limp Bizkit vocalist Fred Durst.

Personal life
Sawa is married to Canadian producer Dawni Sahanovitch. They wed in 2013. They have two children together, a son born in 2014 and a daughter born in 2016.

Sawa has described himself as being irreligious, an atheist, and supportive of religious freedoms.

In June 2022, Sawa gave a lengthy interview to The Independent, where he said that he sought out roles in which the character smoked marijuana to help get away from his teen heartthrob status which began with Casper. Sawa also said that between 2004 and 2009, he "drank a lot" until going sober after meeting his wife in Vancouver.

Filmography

Film

Television

Awards

Notes

References

External links

 
 

1978 births
20th-century Canadian male actors
21st-century Canadian male actors
Canadian male child actors
Canadian male film actors
Canadian people of Polish descent
Canadian male television actors
Canadian male voice actors
Canadian atheists
Living people
Male actors from Vancouver